Jochen Wolfram (born 22 December 1966) is a German former yacht racer who competed in the 2004 Summer Olympics.

References

1966 births
Living people
German male sailors (sport)
Olympic sailors of Germany
Sailors at the 2004 Summer Olympics – Star